Succinate dehydrogenase complex, subunit A, flavoprotein variant is a protein that in humans is encoded by the SDHA gene. This gene encodes a major catalytic subunit of succinate-ubiquinone oxidoreductase, a complex of the mitochondrial respiratory chain. The complex is composed of four nuclear-encoded subunits and is localized in the mitochondrial inner membrane. SDHA contains the FAD binding site where succinate is deprotonated and converted to fumarate. Mutations in this gene have been associated with a form of mitochondrial respiratory chain deficiency known as Leigh Syndrome. A pseudogene has been identified on chromosome 3q29. Alternatively spliced transcript variants encoding different isoforms have been found for this gene.

Structure 
The SDHA gene is located on the p arm of chromosome 5 at locus 15 and is composed of 16 exons. The SDHA protein encoded by this gene is 664 amino acids long and weighs 72.7 kDA.

SDHA protein has four subdomains, including capping domain, helical domain, C-terminal domain and most notably, β-barrel FAD-binding domain at N-terminus. Therefore, SDHA is a flavoprotein (Fp) due to the prosthetic group flavin adenine dinucleotide (FAD). Crystal structure suggests that FAD is covalently bound to a histidine residue (His99) and further coordinated by hydrogen bonds with number of other amino acid residues within the FAD-binding domain. FAD which is derived from riboflavin (vitamin B2) is thus essential cofactor for SDHA and whole complex II function.

Function 

The SDH complex is located on the inner membrane of the mitochondria and participates in both the citric acid cycle and the respiratory chain. The succinate dehydrogenase (SDH) protein complex catalyzes the oxidation of succinate (succinate + ubiquinone => fumarate + ubiquinol). Electrons removed from succinate transfer to SDHA, transfer across SDHB through iron sulphur clusters to the SDHC/SDHD subunits on the hydrophobic end of the complex anchored in the mitochondrial membrane.

Initially, SDHA oxidizes succinate via deprotonation at the FAD binding site, forming FADH2 and leaving fumarate, loosely bound to the active site, free to exit the protein. The electrons derived from succinate tunnel along the [Fe-S] relay in the SDHB subunit until they reach the [3Fe-4S] iron sulfur cluster. The electrons are then transferred to an awaiting ubiquinone molecule at the Q pool active site in the SDHC/SDHD dimer. The O1 carbonyl oxygen of ubiquinone is oriented at the active site (image 4) by hydrogen bond interactions with Tyr83 of SDHD. The presence of electrons in the [3Fe-4S] iron sulphur cluster induces the movement of ubiquinone into a second orientation. This facilitates a second hydrogen bond interaction between the O4 carbonyl group of ubiquinone and Ser27 of SDHC. Following the first single electron reduction step, a semiquinone radical species is formed. The second electron arrives from the [3Fe-4S] cluster to provide full reduction of the ubiquinone to ubiquinol.

SDHA acts as an intermediate in the basic SDH enzyme action:
 SDHA converts succinate to fumarate as part of the Citric Acid Cycle. This reaction also converts FAD to FADH2.
 Electrons from the FADH2 are transferred to the SDHB subunit iron clusters [2Fe-2S],[4Fe-4S],[3Fe-4S]. This function is part of the Respiratory chain
 Finally the electrons are transferred to the Ubiquinone (Q) pool via the SDHC/SDHD subunits.

Clinical significance 

Bi-allelic mutations (i.e. both copies of the gene are mutated) have been described in Leigh syndrome, a progressive brain disorder that typically appears in infancy or early childhood. Affected children may experience vomiting, seizures, delayed development, muscle weakness, and problems with movement. Heart disease, kidney problems, and difficulty breathing can also occur in people with this disorder. The SDHA gene mutations responsible for Leigh syndrome change single amino acids in the SDHA protein, such as a G555E mutation observed in multiple patients, or result in an abnormally short protein. These genetic changes disrupt the activity of the SDH enzyme, impairing the ability of mitochondria to produce energy. It is not known, however, how mutations in the SDHA gene are related to the specific features of Leigh syndrome.
 
SDHA is a tumour suppressor gene, and heterozygous carriers have an increased risk of paragangliomas as well as pheochromocytomas and renal cancer. Risk management for heterozygous carriers of an SDHA mutation can involve annual urine tests for metanephrines and 3-methoxytyramine and MRIs.

Interactive pathway map

References

Further reading 

 
 
 
 
 
 
 
 
 
 
 
 
 
 
 
 
 
 

EC 1.3.5